

Books

Original novels 
Authored by Paul McCusker
1: Strange Journey Back
2: High Flyer with a Flat Tire
3: The Secret Cave of Robinwood
4: Behind the Locked Door
5: Lights Out at Camp What-a-Nut
6: The King's Quest
7: Danger Lies Ahead
8: Point of No Return
9: Dark Passage
10: Freedom Run
11: The Stranger's Message
12: A Carnival of Secrets
Strange Journey Back (Compilation of Books 1-4)
Danger Lies Ahead (Compilation of Books 5-7, 12)
Point of No Return (Compilation of Books 8-11)

Imagination Station book series 
Authored by Marianne Hering with Paul McCusker, Brock Eastman, Marshal Younger, Wayne Thomas Batson, Nancy Sanders, Chris Brack, and Sheila Seifert
1: Voyage with the Vikings
2: Attack at the Arena
3: Peril in the Palace
4: Revenge of the Red Knight
5: Showdown with the Shepherd
6: Problems in Plymouth
7: Secret of the Prince's Tomb
8: Battle for Cannibal Island
9: Escape to the Hiding Place
10: Challenge on the Hill of Fire
11: Hunt for the Devil's Dragon
12: Danger on a Silent Night
13: The Redcoats Are Coming!
14: Captured on the High Seas
15: Surprise at Yorktown
16: Doomsday in Pompeii
17: In Fear of the Spear
18: Trouble on the Orphan Train
19: Light in the Lions' Den
20: Inferno in Tokyo
21: Madman in Manhattan
22: Freedom at the Falls
23: Terror in the Tunnel
24: Rescue on the River (Hardback Only)
25: Poison at the Pump (Hardback Only)
26: Swept into the Sea (Hardback Only)
27: Refugees on the Run (Hardback Only)

Passages spinoff book series 
Authored by Paul McCusker
 1. Darien's Rise
 2. Arin's Judgement
 3. Annison's Risk
 4. Glennall's Betrayal
 5. Draven's Defiance
 6. Fendar's Legacy

Kidsboro spinoff book series 
Authored by Marshal Younger
 1. The Great Kidsboro Takeover
 2. Battle for Control
 3. The Rise and Fall of the Kidsborian Empire
 4. The Creek War
 5. The Risky Reunion
 The Fight for Kidsboro (Compilation)

Radio Scripts 
1. Radio Scripts, Volume 1 by Paul McCusker
2. Radio Scripts, Volume 2 by Phil Lollar
3. Radio Scripts, Volume 3 by Paul McCusker

Candid Conversations with Connie book series 
1. Candid Conversations With Connie (Also available in Audiobook)
2. Candid Conversations With Connie: Volume 2
3. Candid Conversations With Connie: Volume 3

Devotionals 
 Adventures in Odyssey Devotions
 90 Devotions for Kids (Available in paperback, and Leatherette)
 90 Devotions for Kids in Matthew
 Mealtime Devotions
 Mealtime Devotions: The Second Helping

Bibles 
 Adventures in Odyssey Bible (ICBV) (1996)
 Adventures in Odyssey Bible (NKJV) (2000)
 Adventures in Odyssey Bible (NIrV) (2017) (Available in Hardback, Brown Leatherette, and Purple Leatherette)
 Adventures in Odyssey New Testament (NIrV) (2019)

The Blackgaard Chronicles book series 
Authored by Phil Lollar
 1: Opening Moves (Now available!)
 2: Pawn's Play (Now available!)
 3: Cross-Check (Now available!)
 4: Rook's Ruse (Now available!)
 5: Knight's Scheme (Now available!)
(available only in hardback featuring deckle pages)
Note: Eight books were planned for the series.

Young Whit book series 
Authored by Phil Lollar & Dave Arnold
 1: Young Whit and the Traitor's Treasure (Now available!)
 2: Young Whit and the Shroud of Secrecy (Now available!)
 3: Young Whit and the Thieves of Barrymore (Now available!)
(available only in hardback)
Five books are planned for the series.

Mysteries in Odyssey series 
 1. The Case of the Mysterious Message
 2. The Mystery of the Hooded Horseman

Guides 
The Complete Guide to Adventures in Odyssey by Phil Lollar : 
Adventures in Odyssey: The Official Guide by Nathan Hoobler : 
Adventures in Odyssey: The Official Guide-25th Birthday Edition by Nathan Hoobler :

Adapted from Clubhouse Magazine 
Jones and Parker Case Files 
Captain Absolutely
Degrees of Kelvin: Good News for the Galaxy...and Beyond!

Video Series Adaptations 
The Last Days of Eugene Meltsner
Escape from the Forbidden Matrix
The Caves of Qumran

Video Series Novel 
Welcome to Odyssey: The Start of Something Big (based on the Video Series)

See also 
 Adventures in Odyssey

References

External links 
 OdysseyScoop.com All Books
 AIOwiki All Books

Adventures in Odyssey